Le Noyer may refer to the following communes in France:

Le Noyer, Hautes-Alpes, in the Hautes-Alpes département
Le Noyer, Cher, in the Cher département 
Le Noyer, Savoie, in the Savoie département
Le Noyer-en-Ouche, in the Eure département

See also

Noyers (disambiguation)